Rodenäs (North Frisian Runees or Rornees) is a municipality in the district of Nordfriesland, in Schleswig-Holstein, Germany.

The northernmost point of mainland Germany is located in the municipality.

References

Nordfriesland
Denmark–Germany border crossings